João Pedro Pereira dos Santos (born 22 April 1993), commonly known as João Pedro, is a Brazilian footballer who plays for Al-Wahda.

Career
He formerly played for Ferroviário, C.D. Nacional U19, Palmeiras B, Santa Clara, Trofense, Fortaleza, Rayo Majadahonda, Alcobendas, Al-Fateh, Al-Dhafra, Baniyas and Al-Wahda.

Club career statistics

References

1993 births
Living people
Brazilian footballers
Brazilian expatriate footballers
Ferroviário Atlético Clube (CE) players
C.D. Nacional players
Sociedade Esportiva Palmeiras players
C.D. Santa Clara players
C.D. Trofense players
Fortaleza Esporte Clube players
CF Rayo Majadahonda players
CD Paracuellos Antamira players
Al-Fateh SC players
Al Dhafra FC players
Baniyas Club players
Al Wahda FC players
Liga Portugal 2 players
Campeonato Brasileiro Série C players
Segunda División B players
Tercera División players
Saudi Professional League players
UAE Pro League players
Expatriate footballers in Portugal
Expatriate footballers in Spain
Expatriate footballers in Saudi Arabia
Expatriate footballers in the United Arab Emirates
Brazilian expatriate sportspeople in Portugal
Brazilian expatriate sportspeople in Spain
Brazilian expatriate sportspeople in Saudi Arabia
Brazilian expatriate sportspeople in the United Arab Emirates
Association football forwards
Sportspeople from Fortaleza